Tajdar Babar (18 August 1936 – 2 October 2021) was an Indian politician and was member of the First Second and Third Legislative Assembly of Delhi. She was a member of the Indian National Congress and represented Minto Road (Assembly constituency) of Delhi.

Babar died on 2 October 2021 in Delhi.

References

1936 births
2021 deaths
Indian National Congress politicians from Delhi
Delhi MLAs 1993–1998
Delhi MLAs 1998–2003
Delhi MLAs 2003–2008
Women members of the Delhi Legislative Assembly
21st-century Indian women politicians